NCGR may refer to:

National Center for Genome Resources, Santa Fe, New Mexico
National Commission for Government Reforms, Pakistan
National Council for Geocosmic Research